Keith Chan Sze-chun (born 22 September 1977) is a Hong Kong racing driver currently competing in the TCR Asia Series. Having previously competed in the Porsche Carrera Cup Asia, Lamborghini Super Trofeo Asia and GT Asia Series amongst others.

Racing career
Chan began his career in 2010 in GT Asia Series, he also raced in the Volkswagen Scirocco Cup China that year. Between 2011 and 2012, he only raced in the Macau GT Cup. He raced in the Lamborghini Super Trofeo Asia in 2013 and 2015, winning the championship in 2015. In 2014 he raced in the Porsche Carrera Cup Asia.

In November 2015 it was announced that he would race in the TCR Asia Series & TCR International Series, driving a SEAT León Cup Racer for Target Competition.

Racing record

Complete TCR International Series results
(key) (Races in bold indicate pole position) (Races in italics indicate fastest lap)

References

External links
 

1977 births
Living people
TCR Asia Series drivers
TCR International Series drivers
Hong Kong racing drivers